Bulimulus akamatus is a species of  tropical air-breathing land snail, a pulmonate gastropod mollusk in the subfamily Bulimulinae.

This species is endemic to Ecuador.

References

External links
 

Bulimulus
Taxonomy articles created by Polbot